Gardner Ridge is an ice-free ridge  southeast of the Davis Hills, lying at the south side of Klein Glacier in the Queen Maud Mountains of Antarctica. It was mapped by the United States Geological Survey from surveys and U.S. Navy air photos, 1960–63, and was named by the Advisory Committee on Antarctic Names for Eric T. Gardner of U.S. Navy Squadron VX-6, a photographer on Operation Deep Freeze 1966 and 1967.

References

Ridges of Marie Byrd Land